The Lulonga Company was a concession company of the Congo Free State.  It was, with the Société Anversoise and the Abir Congo Company, one of the main producers of rubber in the Free State.  The company's rubber production declined in the early 20th century as a result of over harvesting of the natural rubber vine (Landolphia owariensis gentili) and the entire concession produced just seven tons of rubber in 1905.  Like Abir and the Société Anversoise, the Lulonga Company handed back control of the concession to the Congo Free State in 1906.

References

Bibliography

Belgian colonisation in Africa
History of the Democratic Republic of the Congo
Congo Free State